Operation Ruben (Bosnian, Croatian and Serbian: Akcija Ruben/Акција Рубен) was a police raid operation targeting what police said were suspected radical Islamists in the Republika Srpska, an entity of Bosnia and Herzegovina. It commenced on 6 May 2015, following an attack on a police station in Zvornik. 
Several people were arrested a week after the attack.

Background
 
On 27 April 2015, local Nerdin Ibrić (born 1991), a radical Islamist, attacked a police station in Zvornik. He killed one police officer and wounded two others before he was shot dead by other police officers. Soon after Ibrić's two friends were arrested, the police expanded its investigation to include other radical Islamists, some of whom were also veterans of the Syrian Civil War. The police suspect that the village of Dubnica near Kalesija is one of the major gathering points of radical Islamists. Soon after the attack, Dodik met with Serbian President Tomislav Nikolić and Prime Minister Aleksandar Vučić, asking them for intelligence and counter-terrorism assistance.

Operation
The Interior Ministry spokesman Milan Salamandija said that the search was underway in 32 locations within Republika Srpska. Salamandija said those detained were suspected of having "made supplies of weapons and explosives aimed at committing terrorist acts against the institutions of the Republika Srpska and their representatives". He added that the suspects "belong to radical movements, have fought in or returned from Syria, or were recruiters of jihadists. We found a certain amount of arms and ammunition, bulletproof vests, uniforms and propaganda material for recruitment."

Criticism 

At least 30 people, all of whom are ethnic Bosniaks, were taken into custody by Republika Srpska police for suspected weapons smuggling. The mayor of Srebrenica called the operation a "form of repression" against Bosnian Muslims in Republika Srpska.

Bakir Izetbegović, incumbent Bosniak member of the Presidency of Bosnia and Herzegovina heavily criticised the Republika Srpska police for the operation, saying that they were proceeding to "unnecessary" detentions: "They are acting excessively. Police have seriously crossed the line." Izetbegović also said that the RS Serb police have "overstepped their authority".

Nermin Nikšić said that the terrorist attack on the police station in Zvornik was being used as justification for the persecution of Bosniak returnees in the Republika Srpska. He added: "It is scandalous that 20 years after the war, those in power in Republika Srpska act as in the time when Radovan Karadžić criminally created this entity. We in the SDP believe the actions of the Republika Srpska police directly violate the Dayton Peace Agreement, which guarantees free return of all people in the pre-war places of residence."

The Mayor of Srebrenica Ćamil Duraković said that the Serb police stormed the homes of Bosniaks who returned after the war to homes they were expelled from in the war, and carried out arrests without explanation. He called it a "form of repression."

References 

2015 crimes in Bosnia and Herzegovina
History of Republika Srpska
Law enforcement in Bosnia and Herzegovina
Political controversies in Bosnia and Herzegovina